Agrionoptera longitudinalis is a species of dragonfly in the family Libellulidae.
 
It is native to Indonesia, Papua New Guinea, and Queensland in Australia.
It is common, even abundant in some areas.

This species can be found in most any type of standing water, including pools and tree holes. It is adaptable to disturbed habitat and can live and breed in artificial aquatic habitat types.

Subspecies
Subspecies include:
Agrionoptera longitudinalis biserialis - striped swampdragon
Agrionoptera longitudinalis dissoluta
Agrionoptera longitudinalis longitudinalis

See also
 List of Odonata species of Australia

References

Libellulidae
Odonata of Australia
Insects of Australia
Insects of New Guinea
Insects of Indonesia
Taxa named by Edmond de Sélys Longchamps
Insects described in 1878